Patrick Shanahan (10 March 1908 – 1 February 2000) was an Irish Fianna Fáil politician.

He was elected to Dáil Éireann as a Fianna Fáil Teachta Dála (TD) for the Clare constituency at the December 1945 by-election to succeed Patrick Burke. He lost his seat at the 1948 general election. He died in 2000, aged 91.

References

1908 births
2000 deaths
Fianna Fáil TDs
Members of the 12th Dáil
Politicians from County Clare